The Laguna 33 is an American trailerable sailboat that was designed by W. Shad Turner as a cruiser and first built in 1986.

The Laguna 33 is a development of the Laguna 30 with the addition of a reverse transom. It was later developed into the Classic 33 in 1995.

Production
The design was built by Laguna Yachts in the United States, starting in 1986, but the company went out of business the same year and it is now out of production.

Design
The Laguna 33 is a recreational keelboat, built predominantly of fiberglass, with wood trim. It has a masthead sloop rig, a raked stem, a reverse transom, an internally mounted spade-type rudder controlled by a wheel and a fixed fin keel. It displaces  and carries  of ballast.

The design has the interior lay-out as the Laguna 30, with sleeping accommodation for seven people, with a double "V"-berth in the bow cabin, an "U"-shaped settee around a drop-down dinette table and a straight settee in the main cabin, plus an aft cabin with a double berth on the starboard side. The galley is located on the port side at the companionway ladder. The galley is "U"-shaped and is equipped with a two-burner stove, an ice box and a double sink. A navigation station is opposite the galley, on the starboard side. The head is located just aft of the bow cabin on the port side.

See also
List of sailing boat types

References

Keelboats
1980s sailboat type designs
Sailing yachts
Sailboat type designs by W. Shad Turner
Sailboat types built by Laguna Yachts